Mulling is the process of grinding up a sample into fine powder through mortar and pestle that is dispersed in a paraffin for infrared spectroscopy.

Sample preparation
Using a nonporous ceramic mortar and pestle, a small quantity of the solid sample is ground up until the sample is exceedingly fine and has a glassy appearance. A drop of the mulling agent is added to the ground solid in the mortar. The mixture is further ground up until a uniform paste with the consistency of toothpaste is acquired. The resulting paste is transferred to a salt plate (sodium chloride) with a small flat spatula. The disks are gently pressed together, leaving the sample ready for analysis.

Mulling agents
There are a variety of mineral oils used as mulling agents, their differences being the absorption bands in the infrared spectra.

The most common mineral oil is Nujol, which is  essentially a liquid paraffin based solution and when used for mulling, strong carbon to hydrogen bond absorptions are exhibited in the infrared spectrum. The carbon to hydrogen bond absorptions that may be present in the sample itself are masked by those from the Nujol mulling agent.

Fluorolube is also commonly used, and is essentially a fluorocarbon based solution and exhibits strong carbon to fluorine bond absorptions from 1300 cm−1 onwards to 400 cm−1 in the mid-infrared spectrum.  The useful range for observation of a sample in a mid-infrared spectrum when using Fluorolube as the mulling agent is 4000 cm−1 to 1300 cm−1.

Therefore, if possible, it is preferable to run a sample as both a Nujol mull and a Fluorolube mull. This allows for all of the spectral features of the sample to be seen in an infrared spectrum, because the regions masked by each specific mulling agent are unaffected in the other spectrum.

References

Infrared spectroscopy